The 2010 Blu-express.com Tennis Cup was a professional tennis tournament played on outdoor red clay courts. It was the fourth edition of the tournament which is part of the 2010 ATP Challenger Tour. It took place in Todi, Italy between 13 and 19 September 2010.

Singles main draw entrants

Seeds

 Rankings are as of August 30, 2010.

Other entrants
The following players received wildcards into the singles main draw:
  Marco Crugnola
  Gianluca Naso
  Matteo Trevisan

The following players received entry from the qualifying draw:
  Gerard Granollers-Pujol (as a lucky loser)
  Patricio Heras
  Borut Puc
  Janez Semrajc
  Walter Trusendi
  Mikhail Vasiliev (as a lucky loser)

Champions

Singles

 Carlos Berlocq def.  Marcel Granollers, 6–4, 6–3

Doubles

 Flavio Cipolla /  Alessio di Mauro def.  Marcel Granollers /  Gerard Granollers-Pujol, 6–1, 6–4

External links
Official site
ITF Search 

Blu-express.com Tennis Cup
Clay court tennis tournaments
Internazionali di Tennis Città dell'Aquila
2010 in Italian tennis